Simple Desktop Display Manager (SDDM) is a display manager (a graphical login program) for the X11 and Wayland windowing systems. SDDM was written from scratch in C++11 and supports theming via QML.

SDDM is free and open-source software subject to the terms of the GNU General Public License version 2 or later.

Adoption 
In 2013, Fedora KDE members decided to default to SDDM in Fedora 21.

KDE chose SDDM to be the successor of the KDE Display Manager for KDE Plasma 5.

The LXQt developers recommend SDDM as a display manager.

See also 

 GDM, the default graphical login program of GNOME
 LightDM, formerly the default graphical login program of Ubuntu, replaced by GDM

References 

KDE Software Compilation
Software that uses QML
Software that uses Qt
X display managers